Quogue was a station stop along the Montauk Branch of the Long Island Rail Road and the station was built around June, 1875. During construction the station was moved by the village "on a Sunday morning" from its original and current location to a location on Old Depot Road. The second depot was built around 1882 and later was moved to a private location around 1905. The third depot was built around 1905 and at some point was elevated for the bridge over the former New York State Route 113. The station house was razed around April, 1964 but the station stop itself continued to operate until March 16, 1998. This station, along with nine others around that time were closed due to low ridership, was deemed not cost-effective to rebuild with high-level platforms to support the new C3 railcars the LIRR was procuring at the time.

References

External links
East View of Station House from NY 113 Bridge (TranisAreFun.com)

Railway stations in the United States opened in 1875
Railway stations closed in 1998
Former Long Island Rail Road stations in Suffolk County, New York